Deborah Liebling is an American entertainment executive and film producer. She was formally President of Production of Universal Pictures. Previously, she was a Senior Production Executive at 20th Century Fox.

Before her tenure at 20th Century Fox, she was Senior Vice President of original programming and development at Comedy Central where she was responsible for the development of South Park. She was nominated for three Emmys for her work as Executive Producer on South Park.

Liebling made the switch from television to film on the strength of studio deals she helped with filmmakers like Jay Roach, Peter and Bobby Farrelly, Harold Ramis, Mike Judge, Steve Oedekerk, John Davis and Gil Netter.

At Fox, she was the studio executive that oversaw the production of films including Dodgeball: A True Underdog Story and Borat.

In January 2007, Liebling was promoted President of Production for Fox Atomic. Fox Atomic shut down in early 2009.

Liebling graduated from Boston University in 1981.

Filmography
 South Park – Producer
 Turn Ben Stein On – Executive Producer
 South Park: Bigger, Longer & Uncut – Co-Producer
 Dodgeball: A True Underdog Story – Executive Producer
 Idiocracy – Executive Producer
 Rebound Guy – Executive Producer
 Big Time in Hollywood, FL - Executive Producer
 Plus One - Producer
 Unplugging - Producer
 65 - Producer

References

External links 
 
 
 
 

American television producers
American women television producers
American film producers
Boston University alumni
Living people
Year of birth missing (living people)
21st-century American women